Thorncreek Township is one of nine townships in Whitley County, Indiana, United States. As of the 2010 census, its population was 4,166 and it contained 1,894 housing units.

The township has two main population clusters.  The southern edge of the township consists of the unincorporated northern suburban developments of Columbia City, and in the extreme northeastern part of the township there is the unincorporated settlement and census-designated place known as Tri-Lakes.

Geography
Lakes in this township include Catfish Lake, Cedar Lake, Cedar Lake, Crooked Lake, Karen Lake, Little Cedar Lake, Little Crooked Lake, Metzger Pond, Round Lake and Shriner Lake. The streams of Sell Branch and Thorn Creek run through this township.

Unincorporated towns
 Cresco at 
 Five Points at 
 Tri-Lakes at 
(This list is based on USGS data and may include former settlements.)

Adjacent townships
 Noble Township, Noble County (north)
 Green Township, Noble County (northeast)
 Smith Township (east)
 Union Township (southeast)
 Columbia Township (south)
 Richland Township (southwest)
 Etna-Troy Township (west)

Cemeteries
The township contains one cemetery, Stough.

Major highways
  Indiana State Road 9
  Indiana State Road 109

Airports and landing strips
 Motherwell Airport

Demographics

As of the census of 2000, there were 3,925 people, 1,480 households, and 1,164 families residing in the township. The racial makeup of the township was 98.88% White, 0.08% African American, 0.18% Native American, 0.31% Asian, 0.03% Pacific Islander, 0.18% from other races, and 0.36% from two or more races. Hispanic or Latino of any race were 0.61% of the population.

There were 1,480 households, out of which 34.4% had children under the age of 18 living with them, 70.2% were married couples living together, 4.6% had a female householder with no husband present, and 21.3% were non-families. 17.0% of all households were made up of individuals, and 5.5% had someone living alone who was 65 years of age or older. The average household size was 2.65 and the average family size was 2.99.

In the township the population was spread out, with 26.2% under the age of 18, 6.2% from 18 to 24, 28.3% from 25 to 44, 28.3% from 45 to 64, and 11.1% who were 65 years of age or older. The median age was 40 years. For every 100 females there were 108.4 males. For every 100 females age 18 and over, there were 105.0 males.

The median income for a household in the township was $52,429, and the median income for a family was $56,473. Males had a median income of $42,068 versus $25,054 for females. The per capita income for the township was $22,590. None of the families and 1.8% of the population were living below the poverty line, including no under eighteens and none of those over 64.

References

External links
 U.S. Board on Geographic Names (GNIS)
 United States Census Bureau cartographic boundary files
 Indiana Township Association
 United Township Association of Indiana

Townships in Whitley County, Indiana
Census-designated places in Whitley County, Indiana
Townships in Indiana